The South Pacific air ferry route was initially established in the 1920s to ferry United States Army Air Service aircraft to the Philippines. As the Japanese threat in the Far East increased in 1940, General Douglas MacArthur planned that in the event of war, the United States Army Air Corps would play a major role in defending the Philippines. The reinforcement by the Air Corps of forces in the Philippines, and later Allied forces in Australia, became the basis for developing the South Pacific air ferry route used during World War II.

Overview

After the Pearl Harbor Attack in December 1941, the US Air Transport Command pioneered and established scheduled air service to virtually all areas of the Pacific. The islands of the Japanese South Seas Mandate – formerly unfamiliar to the outside world and islands rarely visited before the war – became important air terminals and way stations along the ATC routes in the Pacific.

After the United States' entry into the Pacific War, the only air service to the Orient was operated by Pan American Airways, while normal shipping lanes were cut off by the Japanese. This necessitated the establishment of new routes, which would skirt the area west of the Hawaiian Islands and north of Australia. In response to this need, ATC inaugurated a trans-Pacific cargo and passenger service through Canton Island, the Fiji Islands, and New Caledonia to Australia. As the war progressed with forward movements of the allied forces transport service was expanded to support the combat operations. New routes were established to include the Solomon Islands, New Guinea, the Gilbert and Marshall Islands, the Marianas, the Philippines, and the Ryukyu island chain. Eventually ATC routes operated into Occupied Japan and connected to the ATC India-China Wing at Kunming Airport, China.

Pre-World War II Pacific transport routes

Ferrying of aircraft to the Philippines from the United States began in 1916 when the First Company, 2d Aero Squadron, was activated at Fort William McKinley, Luzon, on 3 February 1916. This pre-World War I unit was a training school, operating Martin S Hydro seaplanes, first produced in the United States in 1915. These aircraft were sent to the Philippines by ship, with the planes loaded at the port of San Francisco. Stops were made in Hawaii, and then Manila where the aircraft were offloaded.

Pan American Airways inaugurated the first regularly-scheduled air mail service from San Francisco to Hawaii and Manila on 22 November 1935. Passenger and cargo service was subsequently added. In April 1937, Pan American extended its service from Manila to Hong Kong, and to Singapore on 2 May 1941. On 12 July 1940, Trans-Pacific service by Pan American was extended from Hawaii, south to Auckland, New Zealand.

The first US Army mass flight from the United States mainland to the Pacific area was accomplished when crews of the 19th Bombardment Group (H) and the 38th Reconnaissance Squadron, both of the 1st Bombardment Wing, Fourth Air Force, ferried twenty-one B-17D Flying Fortress aircraft from Hamilton Field, California to Hickam Field Hawaii on 13 May 1941. The aircrews returned to Hamilton by ship on 28 May.

A second flight by the 19th Bombardment Group, consisting of twenty-six B-17D aircraft moved from Hamilton Field, California, to Clark Field, Philippines, via Hickam Field, Midway Island, Wake Island, Port Moresby, New Guinea and Darwin, Northern Territory in the first permanent change of station air movement from the United States to the Philippines. The movement was completed on 6 November 1941.

MacArthur believed, as many others did, that the Japanese would not launch any attacks until the end of the 1942 monsoon season. The ensuing months would provide enough time for the Air Corps to ferry additional B-17 Flying Fortresses from the United States to the Philippines. The bombers would fly the route until December 1941. However, this central route, which passed close to the Japanese League of Nations mandate which consisted of several groups of islands (modern-day Palau, Northern Mariana Islands, Federated States of Micronesia, and Marshall Islands), became more vulnerable; as tension grew between the United States and Japan.

South Pacific Route (1942)

To provide a safer air ferry route, the Army Corps of Engineers Honolulu District created a new southern route to the Philippines in the fall of 1941 starting at Hickam Field, Hawaii Territory.

The Japanese, however, did not wait for the monsoon season to pass. After their air attack on Pearl Harbor, Japanese ground forces quickly occupied the Philippines and began advancing through the Southwest Pacific threatening the newly constructed southern air ferry route. To counter this threat, the engineers constructed an easterly alternate route farther removed from Japanese advances by flying south from Christmas Island Airfield .

Central Pacific Route 1945

Southwest Pacific Route 1945

Southeast Pacific Route 1945

See also

 North Atlantic air ferry route in World War II
 Northwest Staging Route
 West Coast Wing (Air Transport Command route to Alaska)
 Crimson Route
 United States Army Air Forces in the South Pacific Area

References

 Thompson, Erwin, (1981), Pacific Ocean Engineers: History of the U.S. Army Corps of Engineers in the Pacific, 1905–1980. U.S. Army Corps of Engineers, Pacific Ocean Division. ASIN: B0006EJBO6
 Franzwa, Gregory (1978), Legacy, the Sverdrup story, Sverdrup Corporation.  ASIN: B001N1Y5BK
 Army Air forces in World War II: The Air Transport Command, VII Services Around the World

Military history of Australia during World War II
Military history of New Zealand during World War II
Fiji in World War II
Pacific theatre of World War II
Aircraft ferrying